Myers' Surinam toad (Pipa myersi) is a species of frog in the family Pipidae found in Panama and possibly Colombia.  Its natural habitats are subtropical or tropical moist lowland forests and rivers. It is threatened by habitat loss.

References

Pipa (frog)
Taxonomy articles created by Polbot
Amphibians described in 1984